SQ5 may refer to:

SQ5, mixtape by Lil Wayne
Space Quest V, a video game